Angelo Ciocca (born 28 June 1975) is an Italian politician and member of the European Parliament.

On 7 July 2016 he succeeded at the European Parliament to Gianluca Buonanno, who died on 5 June in a car accident.

On 23 October 2018 he trampled on a letter from the EU Commissioner for Economic and Monetary Affairs Pierre Moscovici on the rejection of the Italian government financial law, boasting then the gesture in that the shoe had been produced in Italy, even if he still getting a salary from the Commission .

Controversies
Ciocca had been suspected of consorting with the Italian criminal organization 'Ndrangheta in Pavia in 2009.

Judicial proceedings 

In January 2019 he was sentenced to 1 year and 6 months (with conditional suspension of the sentence and non-mention) as part of the penal trial concerning the Lombardy Region reimbursement scandal.

References

1975 births
Living people
MEPs for Italy 2014–2019
Lega Nord MEPs
Lega Nord politicians
Politicians from Pavia
MEPs for Italy 2019–2024